The Ministry of Health, Welfare and Sport (VWS) is the Dutch Ministry responsible for public health, health care, quality of life, social work and sport. The Ministry was created in 1951 as the "Ministry of Social Affairs and Health" and had several name changes before it became the "Ministry of Health, Welfare and Sport" in 1994. The Ministry is headed by the Minister of Health, Welfare and Sport, currently Ernst Kuipers (D66), assisted by one State secretary, currently Maarten van Ooijen (CU).

Organisation
The ministry is currently headed by two Cabinet Ministers and one State secretary. The ministry's main office is located in the centre of The Hague. The civil service is headed by a secretary general and a deputy secretary general, who head a system of three directorates general:
 Public Health, responsible for safety, prevention and sports
 Health Care, responsible for care, medicine and health insurance
 Youth and Welfare

The ministry is also responsible for several autonomous agencies, most prominently:
 Netherlands Institute for Social Research
 Netherlands National Institute for Public Health and the Environment

History
There had been a ministry of Social Work since 1952. In 1965, it was also given responsibility for Culture and Recreation, and it was named Ministry of Culture, Recreation and Social Work. Between 1951 and 1973 there had been a Ministry of Social Affairs and Health Care. In 1973 a separate Ministry of Health and the Environment was formed. In 1982 these two ministries merged to form the Ministry for Health, Welfare and Sports. Responsibilities concerning the environment and nature management were given to the newly reorganized Ministry of Housing, Spatial Planning and the Environment and Agriculture, Nature and Fisheries. The ministry built a new headquarters in 2003 designed by the architect and Driehaus Prize winner Michael Graves.  
In 1996 the responsibility for culture was transferred to the newly reorganized Ministry of Education, Science and Culture.

See also
 List of Ministers of Health of the Netherlands

References

External links
  Ministerie van Volksgezondheid, Welzijn en Sport (Rijksoverheid)

Medical and health organisations based in the Netherlands
Health, Welfare and Sport
Netherlands
Netherlands
Netherlands
Ministries established in 1951
Michael Graves buildings
1951 establishments in the Netherlands